Egghunt Records is an independent record label based in Richmond, Virginia. The label was founded by Adam Henceroth and Gregory Gendron in spring of 2014. Egghunt Records focuses on independent artists.  It releases material on vinyl, CD & cassette physical formats, as well as digital download and streaming online. Egghunt Records maintains an active roster of artists who have toured with notable acts such as The War on Drugs and Houndmouth. Egghunt Records alumni include Lucy Dacus, whose debut album, No Burden, was released on Egghunt Records in 2016. In 2017, Egghunt Records signed Eric Slick of Dr. Dog to release his solo debut album, Palisades. Other notable releases have included Pearla's Quilting & Other Activities (2019) and Camp Howard's Juice EP (2017). In 2021, Egghunt Records joined the Northern Spy Label Group. As of February 2022, Egghunt Records has released 53 releases and continues to support up and coming indie artists.

Artists

Current

 Banditos
 Primer
 Alyssa Gengos
 Abby Huston
 Lizzie Loveless
 Sara Bug
 Clever Girls
 Suburban Living
 Thin Lear
 Deau Eyes
 Pearla
 Gold Connections

Former

 Lucy Dacus
 Eric Slick
 Daddy Issues
 Camp Howard
 Grace Vonderkuhn
 Minor Poet
 Molly Drag
 Manatree
 Majjin Boo
 White Laces
 OPIN
 Sun Machines
 Feral Conservatives
 Sun Machines
 Big Baby
 Mekong Xpress
 Dazeases
 Red States
 Doll Baby
 The Diamond Center
 Teagan Johnston
 DIET
 OKO TYGRA

References 

American independent record labels
American record labels